Dichocrocis plenistigmalis is a moth in the family Crambidae. It was described by Warren in 1895. It is found in India (Khasia Hills).

References

Moths described in 1895
Spilomelinae